Emma Sofia Berglund (born 19 December 1988) is a Swedish footballer. She currently play as a defender for FC Rosengård in the Damallsvenskan and on the Swedish national team.

Club career
Berglund joined Umeå IK in 2006 and later captained the team. She left Umeå after the 2014 season to sign with Damallsvenskan champions FC Rosengård in December 2014. She served as their captain from the 2016 season. In July 2017, it was announced that Berglund had signed a two-year contract with Division 1 Féminine team Paris Saint-Germain.

International career
Berglund made her debut for the senior Sweden team in a 1–1 draw with the United States on 20 November 2011.

In June 2012 Berglund was named in the 18–player Sweden squad for the 2012 London Olympics, where she played Sweden's four games. She missed the 2013 European Championship due to an ACL injury sustained in April 2013.

International goal

Honours

Club
 Umeå IK
 Damallsvenskan: 2006, 2007, 2008
 Svenska Cupen: 2007
 Svenska Supercupen: 2007, 2008

 FC Rosengård
 Damallsvenskan: 2015
 Svenska Cupen: 2016
 Svenska Supercupen: 2015, 2016

 Kopparbergs/Göteborg FC
 Damallsvenskan: 2020

International
Sweden
Summer Olympic Games: Silver Medal, 2016
FIFA Women's World Cup: Bronze Medal, 2019

References

External links

Profile  at SvFF

Living people
1988 births
Sportspeople from Umeå
Swedish women's footballers
Sweden women's international footballers
Footballers at the 2012 Summer Olympics
Footballers at the 2016 Summer Olympics
Olympic footballers of Sweden
Damallsvenskan players
Umeå IK players
FC Rosengård players
2015 FIFA Women's World Cup players
Women's association football defenders
Medalists at the 2016 Summer Olympics
Olympic silver medalists for Sweden
Olympic medalists in football
Paris Saint-Germain Féminine players
Division 1 Féminine players
BK Häcken FF players
Swedish expatriate sportspeople in France
UEFA Women's Euro 2017 players